Laurence Haddon (1922 – May 10, 2013) was an American actor, born in Philadelphia, Pennsylvania. Haddon appeared as a prolific actor in television, movies, and on the stage. He attended Friends' Central School and Syracuse University. He served in the United States Merchant Marine during World War II. Since 1958, he was married to actress/model Jacqueline Prevost with one son Michael, one daughter Phoebe, and one stepson. He died in Santa Monica, California, of "complications associated with Lewy body disease, a form of dementia," according to his daughter-in-law, at age 90 on May 10, 2013.

Film and Television appearances

 Hands of a Stranger (1962) - Police Lt. Syms
 Dennis the Menace (1961-1963, TV Series) - Charles Brady
 Hazel (1961-1966, TV Series) - Bill Fox / Prosecutor
 The Russians Are Coming, the Russians Are Coming (1966) - Bartender (uncredited)
 Torn Curtain (1966) - American Correspondent (uncredited)
 My Three Sons (1966, TV Series) - Don Lennox
 Valley of the Dolls (1967) - Frank - Blue Angel Nightclub Owner (uncredited)
 The Graduate (1967) - Mr. Carlson (uncredited)
 The Flying Nun (1968, TV Series) - Mr. Shapiro
 Room 222 (1969, TV Series) - Roy Gale
 Mission: Impossible (1969-1971, TV Series) - Lee Sheels / Lieutenant Marlov
 The Partridge Family (1970-1971, TV Series) - Coach Dawson / Sergeant Sizemore
 Mannix (1971-1973, TV Series) - Sgt. Carl Simmons / Ted Hanlon
 Sanford and Son (1972) - Ronald Hart
 The Execution of Private Slovik (1974) - Piper
 Kojak (1974, TV Series) - Capt. Ernie Perkins / Steadman
 The Streets of San Francisco (1973-1975, TV Series) - Inspector Wilkins
 Good Times (1975, TV Series) - Monroe
 Mary Hartman, Mary Hartman (1976, TV Series) - Ed McCullough
 Maude (1976, TV Series) - Hal Crandall
 One Day at a Time (1976, TV Series) - Clark
 American Raspberry (1977) - General Jackson
 Quincy, M.E. (1977-1981, TV Series) - Dr. Linnamen / Coach Spalding
 Lou Grant (1977-1981, TV Series) - Foreign Editor / McGrath
 Dallas (1980–1986, TV Series) - Franklin Horner
 Hill Street Blues (1982, TV Series) - Public Defender
 Knots Landing (1984–1985, TV Series) - Dr. Mitch Ackerman
 School Spirit (1985) - Dr. Strohman
 Murder, She Wrote (1986, TV Series) - Judge
 Columbo (1990, TV Series) - Dean Howard Gillespie
 Caged in Paradiso (1990) - Sen. Paradiso
 The Fourth Man (1990, CBS Schoolbreak Special) - Principal Williams
 Designing Women (1991) - Judge
 Infinity (1996) - Family Doctor

References

External links

1922 births
2013 deaths
Male actors from Philadelphia
American male television actors
Syracuse University alumni
United States Merchant Mariners of World War II
Deaths from dementia in California
Deaths from Lewy body dementia